Neopolyptychus serrator is a moth of the family Sphingidae. It is known from forests from the Congo to Uganda and western Kenya. It is also known from Cameroon.

The wingspan is 31–39 mm for males and 39–44 mm for females. The forewings of the males are grey, with faint irregular wavy dark lines, a prominent black dot at the base and a round pinkish stigma. The forewings are paler at the apex. The hindwings are grey with a black streak near the inner margin and one or two black spots near the tornus which is strongly produced. Females have a purple-brown head and body. The ground colour of the forewings is purple-brown, with very faint wavy transverse lines and pinkish mottling. There is a dark brown wedge at the costa, just before the apex. The hindwings are pinkish-brown at the inner margin and the tornus. The remainder is brown and darker than the forewings. The black streak and tornal spots are present, but inconspicuous.

The larvae feed on Maesopsis eminii.

References

Neopolyptychus
Moths described in 1929
Moths of Africa